Equestrian at the 2024 Summer Paralympics in Paris, France will be held at the Château de Versailles. There will be eleven gender free events: ten individual events and one mixed team event.

Qualification

Medalists

See also
Equestrian at the 2024 Summer Olympics

References

Equestrian at the Summer Paralympics
2024 Summer Paralympics events
Equestrian sports competitions in France
Para Dressage